Rodrigo López Muñoz (born December 14, 1975) is a Mexican former professional baseball pitcher and sportscaster. López was a pitcher in the Mexican League in  when the San Diego Padres of Major League Baseball (MLB) purchased his contract.

Career

San Diego Padres
He worked his way up to the major leagues with the Padres, when he made his debut on April 29, . He became a free agent after the 2001 season.

Baltimore Orioles
López joined the Baltimore Orioles in  where he went 15–9 and in the process was runner-up for AL Rookie of the Year.  was a disappointment for López, as he went 7–10 in an injury-marred campaign. In , he was moved to middle relief but pitched his way back into the starting rotation. That year, his record was 14–9.

Colorado Rockies
On January 12, he was traded to the Colorado Rockies for minor leaguers Jason Burch and Jim Miller. López left a start against the Los Angeles Dodgers on July 26, 2007 in the seventh inning with an elbow injury, and he later underwent Tommy John surgery on August 22, 2007. In 14 starts for the Rockies, López went 5-4 with an ERA of 4.42, with 43 strikeouts. He also went 5-1 with an ERA of 3.63 at Coors Field. After the 2007 season, he became a free agent.

Atlanta Braves
On August 22, exactly one year after his surgery, he signed a minor league contract with the Atlanta Braves. He started his Braves career by pitching for the Gulf Coast League Braves, before being promoted to Single-A Rome. He was released by the Braves in November 2008.

Philadelphia Phillies
On March 5, 2009, López signed a minor league contract with the Philadelphia Phillies.  He was called up to the Phillies from the Triple-A Lehigh Valley IronPigs on July 3, 2009 and started that night against the New York Mets, allowing two runs in 6 innings to pick up the win in a 7–2 Phillies victory. It was his first win in the major leagues since he defeated the Phillies on July 7, 2007 as a member of the Colorado Rockies. On September 9, he was released by the Phillies.

Arizona Diamondbacks
López was signed to a minor league contract by the Arizona Diamondbacks on December 16, 2009. On March 30, 2010, Lopez was named the Diamondbacks' 4th starter after having a productive spring training compiling a 2.35 ERA in 5 games with 4 game starts in 15.1 innings.
His regular season was disappointing, however, with an ERA of a flat 5.00 starting in 33 games. He won 7 games, and lost 16.

Atlanta Braves
On January 31, 2011, López signed a minor league contract with the Atlanta Braves.  Atlanta sent him to Triple A at the end of Spring training where he started Opening Day for the Gwinnett Braves.

Chicago Cubs
He was traded to the Chicago Cubs on May 26, 2011, for Ryan Buchter.

On April 23, 2012, Lopez was designated for assignment to make room on the roster for newly acquired Michael Bowden. After clearing waivers, he was sent back to Triple-A Iowa.

Broadcasting career
On December 6, 2013, the Diamondbacks announced that López was hired to join their Spanish language radio broadcast team as the color analyst alongside play-by-play announcer Oscar Soria.

Personal life

His parents are Isabel and Raúl López, he has a brother named Raúl as his father. They live in Mexico City. 
He is married to Romy, and the couple have two boys: Rodrigo Jr. (born March 7, 2003) and Raymond (born March 17, 2005).

References

External links

1975 births
Living people
Arizona Diamondbacks announcers
Arizona Diamondbacks players
Arizona League Padres players
Baltimore Orioles players
Bowie Baysox players
Chicago Cubs players
Clinton LumberKings players
Colorado Rockies players
Colorado Springs Sky Sox players
Diablos Rojos del México players
Gulf Coast Braves players
Gwinnett Braves players
Idaho Falls Braves players
Iowa Cubs players
Lake Elsinore Storm players
Las Vegas Stars (baseball) players
Lehigh Valley IronPigs players
Major League Baseball players from Mexico
Major League Baseball pitchers
Mexican expatriate baseball players in the United States
Mexican League baseball pitchers
Mobile BayBears players
Petroleros de Poza Rica players
Philadelphia Phillies players
Portland Beavers players
Rojos del Águila de Veracruz players
Rome Braves players
San Diego Padres players
2006 World Baseball Classic players
2009 World Baseball Classic players
2013 World Baseball Classic players